Patrick McEnroe and Jared Palmer were the defending champions, but none competed this year.

Cyril Suk and Daniel Vacek won the title by defeating Mark Keil and Peter Nyborg 3–6, 6–3, 6–3 in the final.

Seeds

Draw

Draw

References

External links
 Official results archive (ATP)
 Official results archive (ITF)

1995 ATP Tour
1995 in Swiss tennis
1995 Davidoff Swiss Indoors